Christine Solomon (born February 13, 1981) is an Egyptian-born Canadian actress.

Early life
Solomon was born in Cairo; her family moved to Montreal, Canada when she was 7 years old. She developed an interest in acting during her childhood.

Acting career
Solomon made her stage debut when she was 5 years old, which was followed by theatrical performances, TV commercials, and other roles.

She has acted in over 20 stage plays, performed voice-over roles (including for DL Music) for TV networks and shows including Dr. 90210, the Academy Awards, Fox, Melrose Place, Disney, and videogame publisher Ubisoft. She also performed in films and television shows such as The Score with Academy Award-winning actors Robert De Niro and Marlon Brando, VH1's Hysteria - The Def Leppard Story, Sony Pictures' Head in the Clouds, and HBO Canada's Fakers.

Solomon has compere hosted with Rotana Group (a producer/distributor of Arabic music and film) for music videos, television commercials, and endorsement deals. She is also co-lead in Gabriel's Gift, directed by academy award nominee Roland Joffe.

Awards
Solomon won the Best Actress of Empowerment Award at the 2009 Madbakh Awards in Toronto for her role in Heliopolis. Her role was the first representation of a Gothic woman in Egyptian film. Solomon has appeared in other award-winning films, such as the foreign film, Basra.

Filmography

Video games

References

External links

Canadian film actresses
Canadian television actresses
Living people
Anglophone Quebec people
Dawson College alumni
Actresses from Cairo
Actresses from Montreal
1981 births